Potter Palmer (May 20, 1826 – May 4, 1902) was an American businessman who was responsible for much of the development of State Street in Chicago. Born in Albany County, New York, he was the fourth son of Benjamin and Rebecca (Potter) Palmer.

Retailing career
Potter Palmer founded a dry goods store, Potter Palmer and Company, on Lake Street in Chicago in 1852. Unlike many stores of the time it focused on women and encouraged their patronage.  Palmer instituted a "no questions asked" returns policy and allowed customers to take goods home to inspect before purchasing, which served to nurture the goodwill and patronage of Chicagoans. He made the store much larger and more distinctive than other stores of the time. Palmer was the first owner to advertise with large window displays that included price comparisons.

When Palmer's doctor urged him to get out of the business in 1865 because of ill health, he brought in partners Marshall Field and Levi Leiter. The trio joined forces and renamed the firm Field, Palmer, Leiter and Company. The store would eventually develop into the prominent Midwestern department store chain Marshall Field and Company.

Real estate career

In 1865, Palmer went to his doctor complaining of being overworked and stressed. His doctor advised him to retire from actively managing his store at the age of 38. In 1867, Palmer sold his share of the partnership and went on vacation in Europe for three years before returning to Chicago to focus his efforts on his real estate interests, leasing a new building to his former partners in 1868 at State and Washington. He built several buildings along State Street "on three-fourths of a mile frontage," including the Palmer House Hotel. When his buildings were destroyed in the Great Chicago Fire, Palmer borrowed $1.7 million to rebuild, the largest amount lent to a private individual up to that time. He reclaimed the swampland north of Chicago's commercial district, developing it into Lake Shore Drive. Potter Palmer also moved the city's main commercial district from Lake Street, which ran east and west, to State Street, which ran north and south, parallel with the lake the way Chicago's downtown is currently oriented. Potter Palmer is also responsible for widening State Street.

Personal life
 
In 1871, he married Bertha Honoré. In 1874 a son, Honoré, was born; in 1875, Potter Palmer II.  Both went on to have sons named Potter Palmer III, as well as other children.

In 1885 Palmer built the castle-like Palmer Mansion on Lake Shore Drive, leading to the establishment of the Gold Coast. Prior to that time, Prairie Avenue had been the most desirable address in Chicago.

Palmer is buried in Graceland Cemetery in the north side neighborhood known today as Uptown, Chicago.

References

Further reading
 City of the Century: The Epic of Chicago and the Making of America
 Love Under Fire: The Story of Bertha and Potter Palmer, 2013 half-hour documentary

External links

1826 births
1902 deaths
American real estate businesspeople
American businesspeople in retailing
Businesspeople from Chicago
Burials at Graceland Cemetery (Chicago)
People from Albany County, New York
People in retailing
19th-century American businesspeople